Zhenyuan Daxian, also known as Zhenyuanzi, is a character from the 16th century Chinese novel Journey to the West and a deity who is the patriarch of all Earth's Immortals in Taoist pantheon. He is also regarded as the ancestor of the Earth's Immortals. His dojo is Wanshoushan Wuzhuang Guan, one of the only two officially listed Dongtianfudi in Journey to the West.

Zhenyuan Daxian is not only a character in Journey to the West but is also worshipped in Chinese folk religion. In the prehistoric times, Zhenyuan Daxian often discussed the Tao with the Taishang Laojun and Yuanshi Tianzun, and Taoists claim that he is a candidate for the Sanqing.  Five hundred years ago, he was invited by the Tathagata Buddha to participate in the Menglanbon Festival, so he became attached to Tang Seng's previous life, Jin Chanzi (Golden Cicada).

Journey to the West
In his temple, there is a special Ginsengfruit (人參果) tree that was formed when primeval chaos was first being divided, before the separation of Heaven and Earth. The fruit of the tree is known as "Grass-returning Cinnabar" or "manfruit". The tree produces only 30 fruits every 9,000 years and is shaped like an infant less than three days old. Just by smelling the fruit, a person can extend his lifespan by 360 years; a person who eats the fruit can live an additional 47,000 years. Zhenyuan was invited by Yuanshi Tianzun to listen to it when the protagonists arrived at his temple on their journey, but he had instructed his servants Qingfeng (清風; literally "Clear Wind") and Mingyue (明月; literally "Bright Moon") to give two fruits to Tang Sanzang. Tang Sanzang is frightened when he sees that the fruit looks like a premature infant and refuses to eat it. Qingfeng and Mingyue eat the fruits themselves and are seen by Zhu Bajie. Sun Wukong, however, steals another three fruits for himself and his two juniors. When Qingfeng and Mingyue realize that some of the fruits are missing, they accuse Sun Wukong of theft and call the pilgrims names. Sun Wukong destroys the Ginseng fruit tree in anger and escapes with his companions. When Zhenyuan returns to his temple, he is furious after learning the truth from Qingfeng and Mingyue. He pursues the protagonists and captures them twice after they attempt to flee again. Later he agrees not to punish them if Sun Wukong can find a way to revive the tree.

Sun Wukong visits the Sanxing and many high deities in the heavenly court, but none of them knows how to revive the tree. He finally goes to Guanyin and tells her what happened. Guanyin says, 

The conflict is eventually resolved when Guanyin helps them restore the Ginseng fruit tree back to life. Zhenyuan is so pleased that he gives up his desire for revenge and becomes sworn brothers with Sun Wukong. He treats all of them to a fruit feast before seeing them off on their journey.

References

Chinese deities
Chinese gods
Journey to the West characters
Shapeshifting